Exeter-West Greenwich Regional School District (EWG) is a public school district in Kent County and Washington County, Rhode Island, United States, serving the rural towns of Exeter and West Greenwich in the south-central part of the state. The school district was founded in 1956 and serves approximately 1,600 students. It is one of only four multi-town school districts in the state of Rhode Island, the others being Bristol Warren Regional School District, Chariho Regional School District, and Foster-Glocester School District.

The district operates five schools:
Mildred E. Lineham School (West Greenwich), pre-K
Metcalf Elementary School (Exeter), grades K-6
Wawaloam Elementary School (Exeter), grades K-6
Exeter-West Greenwich Junior High School (West Greenwich), grades 7-8
Exeter-West Greenwich Senior High School (West Greenwich), grades 9-12

The junior and senior high schools are located on the same campus at 930 Nooseneck Hill Road in West Greenwich, close to the Exeter town line.

References 

School districts in Rhode Island
School districts established in 1956
Education in Kent County, Rhode Island
1956 establishments in Rhode Island
Education in Washington County, Rhode Island